Tomoaki is a masculine Japanese given name.

Possible writings
Tomoaki can be written using many different combinations of kanji characters. Some examples:

知明, "know, bright"
知朗, "know, clear"
知晃, "know, clear"
知章, "know, chapter"
知旭, "know, rising sun"
知亮, "know, clear"
知彰, "know, clear"
知昭, "know, clear"
知秋, "know, autumn"
知晶, "know, sparkle"
智明, "intellect, bright"
智朗, "intellect, clear"
智晃, "intellect, clear"
智章, "intellect, chapter"
智旭, "intellect, rising sun"
智亮, "intellect, clear"
智彰, "intellect, clear"
智昭, "intellect, clear"
智秋, "intellect, autumn"
智晶, "intellect, sparkle"
友明, "friend, bright"
友朗, "friend, clear"
友晃, "friend, clear"
友章, "friend, chapter"
友旭, "friend,rising sun"
友彰, "friend, clear"
友昭, "friend, clear"
共明, "together, bright"
共晃, "together, clear"
朋明, "companion, bright"
朋章, "companion, chapter"
朝明, "morning/dynasty, bright"
朝晃, "morning/dynasty, clear"
朝章, "morning/dynasty, chapter
朝昭, "morning/dynasty, clear"

The name can also be written in hiragana ともあき or katakana トモアキ.

Notable people with the name
, Japanese baseball player
, Japanese professional wrestler
, Japanese guitarist 
, Japanese baseball player
, Japanese surgeon
, Japanese footballer
, Japanese pair skater
, Japanese long-distance runner
, Japanese footballer
, Japanese voice actor
, Japanese footballer
, Japanese footballer
, Japanese footballer
, Japanese footballer
, Japanese baseball player
, Japanese baseball player
, Japanese footballer
, Japanese rugby union player
, real name Tomoaki Kusabuka (草深 朋明), Japanese sumo wrestler

Japanese masculine given names